Louie Thomas French (born 14 February 1988) is a British politician who has served as the Member of Parliament (MP) for Old Bexley and Sidcup since the 2021 by-election. A member of the Conservative Party, he was a councillor on Bexley London Borough Council from 2014 until 2022. Prior to his parliamentary career, he worked as a lead portfolio manager for the financial planning and investment firm Tilney.

Early life and career
French was born in Greenwich, London, and grew up in Welling and Sidcup. He attended Blackfen School for Girls, which has a mixed sixth form. 
He was elected as a Conservative councillor for the Falconwood and Welling ward in the 2014 Bexley Borough Council election, and was re-elected in 2018. Alongside his role as councillor, he was also a senior research analyst and later lead portfolio manager for sustainable portfolios and services for the financial planning and investment firm Tilney.

Parliamentary career
French was selected as the Conservative candidate for the 2021 Old Bexley and Sidcup by-election on 30 October 2021. The by-election was called after the death of the incumbent Conservative MP James Brokenshire from lung cancer on 7 October 2021. The constituency is considered a safe Conservative seat and has been represented by a member of the party since its creation in 1983. French was elected with a majority of 4,478 (20.6%), reduced from 18,952 (41.0%) at the 2019 election. The turnout was low, at 33.5%. French had previously contested the Eltham seat at the 2019 general election, in which he finished second to the incumbent Labour MP Clive Efford. 

French pledged to focus on increasing the number of police officers, investment in schools and hospitals, and protecting green spaces in the constituency. French had also pledged to quit his job as a lead portfolio manager for Tilney if he was elected as MP which he reported doing so in his first week. During the campaign, he had initially said that he would continue at Tilney as MP but later ruled it out. He was one of 99 Conservative MPs to vote against Covid passes in England in December 2021. 

French made his maiden speech on 18 January 2022, in which he paid tribute to Brokenshire. French has been a member of the Public Accounts Committee since March 2022. French endorsed Rishi Sunak in the July–September 2022 Conservative Party leadership election.

References

External links

1988 births
Conservative Party (UK) MPs for English constituencies
Conservative Party (UK) councillors
Councillors in the London Borough of Bexley
Living people
UK MPs 2019–present